is a railway station in the town of Ōwani, Aomori Prefecture, Japan, operated by the private railway operator, Kōnan Railway Company.

Lines
Sabaishi Station is served by the Kōnan Railway Ōwani Line, and lies 2.2 kilometers from the southern terminus of the line at Ōwani Station.

Station layout
The station has one island platform. There is no station building, but only a weather shelter on the platform. The station is unattended.

Platforms

Adjacent stations

History
Sabaishi Station was opened on January 26, 1952 with the opening of the Kōnan Railway.

Surrounding area
Hirakawa River

See also
 List of railway stations in Japan

External links

Kōnan Railway home page 
 Location map 

Railway stations in Aomori Prefecture
Konan Railway
Ōwani, Aomori
Railway stations in Japan opened in 1952